Giuseppe Cipriani may refer to:

 Giuseppe Cipriani (chef) (1900–1980), founded Harry's Bar in Venice in 1931
 Giuseppe Cipriani (racing driver) (born 1966), Italian racing driver
 Giovanni Battista Cipriani (1727–1785), also called Giuseppe Cipriani, Italian painter and engraver